The spot-backed antbird (Hylophylax naevius) is a species of bird in the family Thamnophilidae, the antbirds. It is found in Bolivia, Brazil, Colombia, Ecuador, French Guiana, Guyana, Peru, Suriname, and Venezuela. Its natural habitats are subtropical or tropical moist lowland forests and subtropical or tropical swamps.

Taxonomy
The spot-backed antbird was formally described in 1789 by the German naturalist Johann Friedrich Gmelin in his revised and expanded edition of Carl Linnaeus's Systema Naturae. He placed it with the manakins in the genus Pipra and coined the binomial name Pipra naevia. Gmelin based his description on the Fourmillier tacheté, de Cayenne that had been depicted in a hand-coloured engraving by François-Nicolas Martinet that was published to accompany Comte de Buffon's Histoire Naturelle des Oiseaux. The specific epithet is from Latin naevius meaning "spotted". The spot-backed antbird is now placed with two other species in the genus Hylophylax that was introduced in 1909 by the American ornithologist Robert Ridgway.

Five subspecies are recognised:
 H. n. theresae (des Murs, 1856) – southeast Ecuador, northeast Peru and west Amazonian Brazil
 H. n. peruvianus Carriker, 1932 – central north Peru
 H. n. inexpectatus Carriker, 1932 – southeast Peru, southwest Brazil (Acre) and northwest Bolivia
 H. n. naevius (Gmelin, JF, 1789) – southeast Colombia and northeast Ecuador to the Guianas, north Peru and north Brazil
 H. n. ochraceus (Berlepsch, 1912) – central south, southeast Amazonian Brazil

References

External links
Spot-backed antbird videos on the Internet Bird Collection
Spot-backed antbird photo gallery VIREO

spot-backed antbird
Birds of the Amazon Basin
Birds of the Guianas
spot-backed antbird
spot-backed antbird
Taxonomy articles created by Polbot